The 1931 Stanley Cup Finals was played between the Montreal Canadiens and the Chicago Black Hawks, making their first Stanley Cup Finals appearance. The defending champions Canadiens, won the series to become the second NHL team to win back-to-back championships. Former player and now coach, Chicago's Dick Irvin, made his Finals coaching debut against the team he would later coach to three Stanley Cup titles.

Game summaries
Over 18,000 fans packed Chicago Stadium for game two to set a record for the largest attendance in hockey history to that time. The triple-overtime game three of the series was (at the time) the longest game in Stanley Cup Finals history, and today remains the fourth-longest game in Stanley Cup Finals history at 113:50.

Game five
For game five, Foster Hewitt came to Montreal to make the radio broadcast play-by-play and transmission lines carried his broadcast to radio stations across Canada Interest was so high that Montrealers in the thousands lined up for end zone and standing room tickets. Johnny Gagnon opened the scoring in the second period and Howie Morenz scored an insurance goal in the third period. It ended a nine-game goalless streak for Morenz.

Stanley Cup engraving
The 1931 Stanley Cup was presented to Canadiens captain Sylvio Mantha by NHL President Frank Calder following the Canadiens 2–0 win over the Black Hawks in game five.

The following Canadiens players and staff had their names engraved on the Stanley Cup

1930–31 Montreal Canadiens

See also
1930–31 NHL season

Notes

References

 
 Podnieks, Andrew; Hockey Hall of Fame (2004). Lord Stanley's Cup. Bolton, Ont.: Fenn Pub. pp 12, 50. 

Stanley Cup
Stanley Cup Finals
Chicago Blackhawks games
Montreal Canadiens games
April 1931 sports events
Ice hockey competitions in Chicago
Ice hockey competitions in Montreal
Stan
1931 in Quebec
1930s in Chicago
1930s in Montreal